The Compact Oxford English Dictionary of Current English is a one-volume dictionary published by Oxford University Press.  It is intended for family or upper secondary school readerships.  The third edition (revised), published in 2008, has 1,264 pages, somewhat smaller than the Concise Oxford English Dictionary, and is distinct from the "Compact" (single- and two-volume photo-reduced) editions of the multi-volume Oxford English Dictionary.

Publications

Compact Oxford English Dictionary of Current English
Third edition revised: Includes over 150,000 words, phrases, and definitions.
?th impression (2008-06-19)

Compact Oxford Thesaurus
Third edition revised: Includes over 300,000 synonyms and antonyms.
?th impression

References

External links
Compact Oxford English Dictionary of Current English
Oxford University Press pages: Third edition revised
Compact Oxford English Dictionary of Current English from the OUP catalogue
Compact Oxford Thesaurus
Oxford University Press pages: Third edition revised

Oxford dictionaries
English dictionaries